West Hillhurst is a northwest neighbourhood lying within the inner suburbs of Calgary, Alberta, Canada. The community, which is located west of Hillhurst, is bisected by Crowchild Trail. On the north, West Hillhurst is bordered by the communities of Hounsfield Heights/Briar Hill and St. Andrews Heights. Other boundaries are 18th Street W to the east, the Bow River to the south and 28th Street W to the west.

History
Although annexed by the city of Calgary in 1907, substantial development did not occur until 1945 when many of the houses were built as "Victory Homes" for soldiers returning from World War II.  A number of these buildings are still standing despite the fact that many were only intended to be temporary.

Demographics

As of 2000, there were 16.4% low income residents living in the neighbourhood, and 12.8% of the residents were immigrants. 30.6% of the buildings were condominiums or apartments, and 44.1% of the housing was used for renting.

Education

In 2006, there were two schools in the district:
 École Madeleine d'Houet Bilingual Junior High School - A Separate Catholic school
 Louise Dean Centre - A public high school for new and expectant young mothers throughout Calgary.

See also
List of neighbourhoods in Calgary

References

External links
Calgary Area - West Hillhurst Community Info

Neighbourhoods in Calgary